Koda Kumi Driving Hit's 2 is the third remix album released by Japanese singer/songwriter, Kumi Koda. It was released a year after Koda Kumi Driving Hit's on March 31, 2010. It ranked higher than its predecessor, coming in at #5 on Oricon and staying on the charts for twelve weeks.

Track listing
(Source)
"Lick me♥" [Prog5 BIG BASS Remix]
"Driving" [GROOVE HACKER$ Remix]
"Ecstasy [Caramel Pod Remix]"
44th single 3 SPLASH
"Cutie Honey" [MITOMI TOKOTO Remix]
"Rain" [PLUG in LANGUAGE Remix]
"Shake It Up" [HOUSE NATION Sunset In Ibiza Remix]
"No Regret [FUTURE HOUSE UNITED Remix] 
"Last Angel feat. Tohoshinki" [neroDoll Remix]
"UNIVERSE" [Pink Chameleons Remix]
"you" [Floor on the Intelligence Remix]
"1000 no Kotoba" [Shohei Matsumoto & Junichi Matsuda Remix]
"hands" [The Standard Club PIANO DANCE Remix]
"Taisetsu na kimi e" [Ryuzo Remix]
"stay with me" [Tomoharu Moriya Remix]
"Yume no Uta"  [Sunset In Ibiza Remix]
"Trust Your Love" [Terminal Vox Remix]
"love across the ocean" [Caramel Pod Remix]

Oricon Charts (Japan)

References

Koda Kumi albums
2010 remix albums
Avex Group remix albums